Mala Gopal Gaonkar (born November 1969) is an American businesswoman, former portfolio manager at investment firm Lone Pine Capital, and the head of hedge fund SurgoCap Partners.

Early life and education
Gaonkar was born in November 1969 in the U.S. and mostly raised in Bengaluru, India. She earned a degree from Harvard College in 1991, then an MBA from Harvard Business School in 1996.

Career
Gaonkar was a founding partner of investment firm Lone Pine Capital, where she worked for 23 years and was a portfolio manager. After graduating from Harvard College, she worked for Boston Consulting Group and completed her MBA at Harvard Business School before Lone Pine's inception in 1998. She is a trustee of Clinton Health Access Initiative (CHAI), and was a founding trustee of Ariadne Labs, The Queen Elizabeth Prize for Technology, as well as Surgo Foundation, which provides data science tools for a smarter public health ecosystem. She also serves as a trustee of RAND and of the Tate. and is a member of Harvard's Global Advisory Council.

She collaborated with David Byrne in 2016 to create a guided immersive theater performance, Neurosociety. In 2022, they co-created another immersive production, based on Byrne's life, "Theater of the Mind".

In 2020, Gaonkar founded Surgo Ventures, a nonprofit organization.

In 2022, she left Lone Pine Capital and started SurgoCap Partners, a hedge fund which was launched on January 3, 2023, managing $1.8 billion. This was the largest-ever debut of a hedge fund run by a woman.

As an author, Mala Gaonkar has published short stories in Catamaran, Carolina Quarterly, and American Short Fiction. Her short story, "The New Maid" was nominated for a Pushcart Prize and received special mention in its 2022 anthology.

Personal life
Gaonkar is married to fellow private equity manager, businessman Oliver Haarmann. They have two sons, and live in London. Gaonkar has taken the Giving Pledge.

References

Harvard College alumni
Harvard Business School alumni
Living people
1969 births
People from Bangalore
American women in business
Boston Consulting Group people
American hedge fund managers